Iberian gudgeon (Gobio lozanoi) is a species of gudgeon, a small freshwater in the family Cyprinidae. It is widespread only in the Iberian Peninsula where it is indigenous in the Ebro and Bidasoa drainage, and in France in the Adour drainage, as well as Andorra. It has been introduced throughout the Iberian Peninsula, including Portugal, It is a freshwater demersal fish, up to 11.9 cm long.

Named in honor of Luis Lozano Rey (1878-1958), University of Madrid, for his contribution to the knowledge of Iberian freshwater fishes.

References 

Gobio
Fish described in 2004
Cyprinid fish of Europe
Fauna of Spain